Andy Cowell is a British Formula One engineer. He was most recently the managing director at Mercedes AMG High Performance Powertrains. He is also a Fellow of both the IMechE and the Royal Academy of Engineering.

Career

Cowell studied Mechanical Engineering at university, and joined Cosworth on their graduate scheme straight and then worked his way through the company’s various technical departments before specialising in the design and development of Formula One engines. By 1998, Cowell was responsible for the engineering project group for the top end of the innovative CK engine, which powered Stewart Grand Prix to a win in 1999. He spent a year with BMW Motorsport in 2000, steering the engineering group that designed the 2001 BMW-Williams engine.

Cowell returned to Cosworth as Principal Engineer for F1 design and development in 2001, managing new engine projects in 2001 and 2003, before joining Mercedes-Ilmor in 2004 as Principal Engineer for the FQ V10 engine project. He worked as Chief Engineer on Ilmor’s V8 engine project before taking on oversight for the technical and programme leadership of all engine projects – including the KERS Hybrid system, which debuted in 2009.

Cowell subsequently served as the Engineering Director for Mercedes-Benz High Performance Engines from July 2008 to January 2013, responsible for technical and programme leadership of all engine and powertrain projects, including the organisation and strategy of the engineering group. In January 2013, Cowell became the Managing Director of Mercedes AMG High Performance Powertrains, replacing Thomas Fuhr.  It was in this role in which he oversaw development of the innovative PU106A V6 Hybrid Power Unit; which went on to successfully power the 2014 championship-winning F1 W05 Hybrid and was unanimously considered to be the best powertrain in the first year of the turbo-hybrid era.

Under Cowell's stewardship, Mercedes AMG High Performance Powertrains has powered the Mercedes works team to 12 world titles in six years, winning both the Drivers’ and Constructors’ Championships in 2014, 2015, 2016, 2017, 2018, 2019 and 2020. In June 2020 Cowell left Mercedes to seek a new challenge, he was succeeded by Hywel Thomas.

References

1969 births
Living people
British engineers
Formula One engine engineers
Fellows of the Institution of Mechanical Engineers
Fellows of the Royal Academy of Engineering